Marion may refer to:

People
Marion (given name)
Marion (surname)
Marion Silva Fernandes, Brazilian footballer known simply as "Marion"
Marion (singer), Filipino singer-songwriter and pianist Marion Aunor (born 1992)

Places

Antarctica
 Marion Nunataks, Charcot Island

Australia
 City of Marion, a local government area in South Australia
 Marion, South Australia, a suburb of Adelaide
 Marion railway station

Cyprus
 Marion, Cyprus, an ancient city-state

South Africa
Marion Island, one of the Prince Edward Islands

United States
 Marion, Alabama
 Marion, Arkansas
 Marion, Connecticut
 Marion Historic District (Cheshire and Southington, Connecticut)
 Marion, Georgia
 Marion, Illinois
 Marion, Indiana, Grant County
 Marion station (Indiana)
 Marion, Shelby County, Indiana
 Marion, Iowa
 Marion station (Iowa)
 Marion, Kansas
 Marion County Lake
 Marion Reservoir
 Marion, Kentucky
 Marion, Louisiana
 Marion, Massachusetts
 Marion Station, Maryland, often referred to as just "Marion"
 Marion, Michigan
 Marion, Minnesota
 Marion, Mississippi
 Marion, Missouri
 Marion, Montana
 Marion, Nebraska
 Marion, Jersey City, New Jersey
 Marion, New York, a town 
 Marion (CDP), New York, a hamlet and census-designated place
 Marion, North Carolina
 Marion, North Dakota 
 Marion, Ohio, the largest US city named Marion
 Marion Union Station
 Marion, Oregon
 Marion, Pennsylvania
 Marion, South Carolina
 Marion, South Dakota
 Marion, Texas
 Marion, Utah
 Marion, Virginia
 Marion, Wetzel County, West Virginia
 Marion, Grant County, Wisconsin, a town
 Marion, Juneau County, Wisconsin, a town
 Marion, Waushara County, Wisconsin, a town
 Marion, Wisconsin, a city
 Marion County (disambiguation)
 Marion Township (disambiguation)

Arts and entertainment

Fictional characters
Marion Crane, the female lead in Psycho, played by Janet Leigh
Marion Cunningham, on the television show Happy Days
Marion Hill, main character in the American sitcom In the House, portrayed by LL Cool J
Marion Moseby, on the television show The Suite Life of Zack & Cody and the spin-off series The Suite Life on Deck
Marion Paroo, in The Music Man
Marion Ravenwood, from the Indiana Jones films
Marion Stimpleman, a minor character in Boy Meets World
Marion Tweedy, maiden name of Molly Bloom in James Joyce's Ulysses
Marion (Thomas & Friends), a railway self-propelled steam shovel
 Marion (or Marian), a typical name for the shepherdess character in the pastourelle genre of Old French lyric poetry
Marion, Harriet's rival in Harriet the Spy by Louise Fitzhugh
Marion, in the video game GunBird
Maid Marian, from the legend of Robin Hood

Other
Marion (band), a British alternative rock group
Marion (miniseries), a 1974 miniseries

Other uses
 Marion High School (Kansas)
 Marion Military Institute, Marion, Alabama, the oldest military junior college in the United States
 Marion Power Shovel Company, best known for building the crawler-transporters used to move launch vehicles at the Kennedy Space Center
 United States Penitentiary, Marion, a federal prison for male inmates

See also
 
 Marion Bay (disambiguation)
 Marion Historic District (disambiguation)
 Marian (disambiguation)
 Marijonas